1-2-3-4 is an album by American bassist Ray Drummond which was recorded in 1997 and released on the Arabesque label in 1999.

Reception

The AllMusic review by Michael G. Nastos said "Drummond's made yet another very fine recording -- what a great treasure jazz has in this bassist, composer, and bandleader. Easily recommended to all lovers of the modern mainstream and jazz in general". All About Jazz said "1-2-3-4 was created, performed, and recorded by a singularly intuitive group of musicians under the guidance of a legitimate mainstay in the modern jazz tradition. An in-depth critical analysis of 1-2-3-4 is unnecessary; it should simply be listened to and enjoyed".

Track listing
All compositions by Ray Drummond except where noted
 "Ana Maria" (Wayne Shorter) – 8:01
 "Ballade Poetique" – 3:55
 "Driftin'" – 6:37
 "Prelude to a Kiss" (Duke Ellington, Irving Gordon, Irving Mills) – 2:31
 "What Is Happening Here" – 8:04
 "Little Waltz" (Ron Carter) – 3:59
 "Goin' Home" (Traditional) – 7:57
 "Kinda Like" – 3:46
 "Nefertiti" (Shorter) – 6:53
 "Mr. P.C." (John Coltrane) – 4:07
 "Oh Jay" – 5:12
 "Willow Weep for Me" (Ann Ronell) – 5:27

Personnel
Ray Drummond – double bass
Craig Handy – tenor saxophone, soprano saxophone
Stephen Scott – piano
Billy Hart – drums

References

Arabesque Records albums
Ray Drummond albums
1999 albums